Clarence Lucien  Phelps (January 8, 1881 – May 7, 1964) was the first provost of the University of California, Santa Barbara.

Phelps served as president of UCSBs predecessor Santa Barbara State Normal School of Manual Arts and Home Economics from 1918, and his administrative title was changed in 1944 when the campus became a part of the University of California. He retired from the position in 1946.

He was educated from Stanford University, where he received his A.B. and M.A. degrees.

References

1881 births
1964 deaths
University of California, Santa Barbara faculty
Stanford University alumni
20th-century American academics